Thomas Arthur Dennis (1882 – January 1940) was an English professional snooker and English billiards player.

Career
Dennis reached the final of the World Championship in 1927, 1929, 1930, and 1931, but was beaten every time by Joe Davis. The closest Dennis came to defeating Davis was in the 1931 tournament, when the pair were the only two entrants. The match, played in the back room of his own pub in Nottingham, saw Dennis lead 14-10 and 19–16, before losing 21–25. He competed in two more championships, making his last appearance in 1933. He also reached the final of the tournament in 1927, losing again to Davis in the final 11–20. After his final loss in 1931, he played in the event twice more, losing in the semi final on both occasions, to Clark McConachy, and Willie Smith respectively.

Dennis had to withdraw from the 1936 World Snooker Championship after having an operation on his right eye.

Personal life
He had three sons: Thomas Leslie, William Henry by his first wife and David with his second wife, Kathleen. William was a successful amateur snooker player, reaching the final of the 1937 English Amateur Championship, losing 5–3 to Kingsley Kennerley.

Career finals

Non-ranking finals: 4

References

English snooker players
English players of English billiards
1882 births
1940 deaths
Sportspeople from Nottingham